Historic designations in the City of Pittsburgh  are awarded following nominations for districts and individual structures that are reviewed and recommended to Pittsburgh City Council, which makes the final decision, by the city's Historic Review Commission and the City Planning Commission. This list is not to be confused with the list of landmarks designated by the Pittsburgh History and Landmarks Foundation. City Historic Designation establishes a regulatory process for the review of all changes and alterations by the Historic Review Commission to the publicly viewable exterior and appearance of all buildings that are designated, either individually or as part of a district. As of 2011, there were 12 designated districts in the city, two historic objects, one historic site, and 87 individual structures.

Districts
This following table lists the 14 historic districts designated by the Pittsburgh City Council through 2019. The table is initially sorted alphabetically by their official listing.

Objects
The following table the two historic objects designated by the Pittsburgh City Council as of July 2010. The table is initially sorted alphabetically by their official listing.

Sites
This following table lists the one historic site designated by the Pittsburgh City Council through 2010. More recent listings are included with a separate reference.

Structures
The following table is up to date as of the most recent listings published by the City of Pittsburgh in June 2019. More recent listings are included with a separate reference. The table is initially sorted alphabetically by official listing name.

Former listings

Active nominations

Notable failed nominations

See also
 List of Pittsburgh History and Landmarks Foundation Historic Landmarks
 National Register of Historic Places listings in Pittsburgh, Pennsylvania
 National Register of Historic Places listings in Allegheny County, Pennsylvania
 List of Pennsylvania state historical markers in Allegheny County

References

External links

City of Pittsburgh Historic Review Commission
City of Pittsburgh Historic Preservation Program
Pittsburgh History & Landmarks Foundation - Local Historic Designations

 
 
Historic designations
Historic designations
Locally designated landmarks in the United States